This is a list of flag bearers who have represented Qatar at the Olympics.

Flag bearers carry the national flag of their country at the opening ceremony of the Olympic Games.

See also
Qatar at the Olympics

References

Qatar at the Olympics
Qatar
Olympic flagbearers